Robert Weyman Cotton (December 29, 1920 – March 10, 1999) was an American professional basketball player. He played for the Chicago American Gears in the National Basketball League and averaged 1.3 points per game. Cotton also played in various minor leagues after his time in the military during World War II.

References

1920 births
1999 deaths
American men's basketball players
United States Army personnel of World War II
Basketball players from Texas
Centers (basketball)
Chicago American Gears players
Forwards (basketball)
People from Wichita Falls, Texas
Texas Wesleyan Rams men's basketball players